Henry Sears  was a Canadian modernist architect, and an urban and gallery planner. He was a founding partner of both Klein & Sears Architects and Sears & Russell Architects Ltd. His work centred around social housing development on a neighbourhood scale. It spanned Canada, the United States and Europe.

Career 
Sears began his career in 1958, opening an architecture firm with Jack Klein. The firm maintained close ties to Raymond Moriyama, with whom they shared an office that opened on the same day. The Sears family lived on Woodlawn Avenue in the neighbourhood of Summerhill, Toronto for some time, living alongside many other architects and academics on the street and in the area.

As part of Sears & Russell Architects Ltd., beginning in 1987, Henry Sears' work shifted focus to the design and planning of cultural institutions. The firm built a team of specialists to adapt to the many areas in which the partners now worked. The geographic reach of Sears & Russell began to shift as well, taking on new clients in the United States and Europe. This produced a balance of national and international work, strengthening Sears' presence abroad.

Throughout his career, Sears developed an architectural style. His primary material was brick, influenced by the homogeneity of European communities that use it. This applied a modern approach to a traditional technique and style. Many of his projects had shared communal space such as paths or courtyards, deemed an "exemplary design solution." by James Murray of Canadian Architect, along with the placement of cars outside of the major arteries of the project or underground. This focus on community interaction and involvement was part of a movement based on the Defensible space theory. Using this approach, Sears designed Alexandra Park which, in the 1990s, went on to become the first self-managed public housing initiative in Canadian history.

Sears was named the third most interesting Canadian in 1978 as part of The First Original Unexpurgated Canadian book of Lists with the reasoning thatThis Toronto-based architect is a brilliant theoretician and has taken his discipline to new heights, embracing sociology and psychology in helping others to design buildings and institutions which serve the soul as well as the eye.

Buildings

Curatorial and gallery work 
Henry Sears contributed to the gallery design and curatorial approach of many museums around the globe. When the National Museum of Ireland was lacking display space, they called on Sears to lead the creation of a master plan for a new building on the Collins Barracks, Dublin grounds, along with the functional brief that would act as a guide to implement the change. He found "The challenge was to incorporate the technically demanding requirements of a contemporary museum into the existing historic context appropriately and sensitively." Sears then went on to develop the museum's exhibit strategy and the functional brief for its Irish folklife division. He described that "Working in Ireland seems to have opened a world of possibilities for the firm." Other building design of cultural institutions includes the curatorial centre at Ken Seiling Waterloo Region Museum, a partnership with Joe Somfay Architect Inc., and additions to both Whitby's Centennial building, and Mississauga's Benares Historic House, where a museum was established in 1995. In Whitby, this new multi-story West Wing was part of a reconfiguration to house a museum and the Whitby archives and, in Sears' words, for the institution to "...play a significant part in the cultural life of the community".

Sears also played a role in developing a new curatorial approach at the Royal Ontario Museum in consultation with its staff. He consulted on gallery design at the museum and taught the same subject at the Adler Planetarium in Chicago. Sears reported to the Museum of Vancouver and its H. R. MacMillan Space Centre in 1996, recommending serious structural reforms. This resulted in new management with increased oversight from the Vancouver City Council, along with greater input from indigenous peoples. In the same year, he reported on the state of the Oshawa Museum as part of a facility study with the Canadian Conservation Institute and the cultural facilities in the City of Hamilton. Sears created master plans for both the Sharon Temple in East Gwillimbury, Ontario, and the B&O Railroad Museum in Baltimore. He performed a feasibility study in 1986 at the Bruce County Museum and Cultural Centre and a facilities study of the Kinngait Cultural Centre in 1990. He designed permanent exhibition space at both the Nova Scotia Museum of Industry in 1993 and the McDonald Observatory. Sears consulted with Yale's Peabody Museum of Natural History, the Canadian Forces Communication & Electronic Museum at CFB Kingston, the New York State Museum in Albany, and the Ojibwe Cultural Foundation on Manitoulin Island, Ontario.

Honours and awards
 Fellow of the Royal Architectural Institute of Canada (FRAIC) (1971)
 Member of the Royal Canadian Academy of Arts
Member of the Ontario Association of Architects
 2 Massey Medals for Architecture (1964 & 1967)
 Canadian Architect Award of Excellence (1976)
 2 Canadian Housing Design Council National Design Awards (1967 & 1985), 2 Honourable Mentions (1969 & 1976), 
 Centennial Award (1967)
 OAA Landmark Winner (2009)

References 

20th-century Canadian architects
Modernist architects
Canadian Jews
Jewish architects
People from Toronto
1929 births
2003 deaths
Members of the Royal Canadian Academy of Arts